The men's time trial H2 road cycling event at the 2020 Summer Paralympics took place on 31 August 2021, at the Fuji Speedway in Tokyo. 7 riders competed in the event.

The H2 classification is for tetraplegics with minor upper limb impairment from C7 thru T3. These riders operate a hand-operated cycle.

Results
The event took place on 31 August 2021, at 10:15:

References

Men's road time trial H2